North Bridge Road is a one-way road in Singapore, running north of the Singapore River. It starts at the junction with Crawford Street in Kallang, on the western bank of the Rochor River, and continues in a southwest direction before ending at Elgin Bridge. The stretch south of the Singapore River after Elgin Bridge is called South Bridge Road. En route, North Bridge Road travels through the planning areas of Kallang, Rochor and the Downtown Core.

North Bridge Road is one of the oldest roads in Singapore and was outlined in the Jackson Plan. North Bridge Road was constructed by GD Coleman between 1833 and 1835, and built by convict labour. The road was a route for trams, trolley buses and once the one-way street until Victoria Street became 2-way street on 11 April 1993. North Bridge Road was called the "Big Horseway" in the past.

Landmarks

Bras Basah Complex
Bugis Junction
Capitol Building
CHIJMES
City Hall MRT station
Funan
Istana Kampong Glam (Malay Heritage Centre)
Masjid Sultan
National Library
Parkview Square
Parliament House
Peninsula Plaza
Raffles Hospital
Raffles Hotel
Raffles City
Saint Andrew's Cathedral
Supreme Court
The Treasury

Roads in Singapore
Downtown Core (Singapore)
Kallang
Rochor